Seyyed Hassan Modarres ( c. 1870Sarabeh, 1 December 1937, Kashmar) was an Iranian Twelver Shi'a cleric and a notable supporter of the Iranian Constitutional Revolution.  He was among the founding members, along with Abdolhossein Teymourtash, of the reformist party Hezb-e Eslaah-talab, which was formed during the fourth national Majlis of Iran. He has been called "brave and incorruptible" and "perhaps the most fervent mullah supporter of true constitutional government."

Biography
The sources disagree on his birthplace. Some mention that he was born in Ardestan around 1870, 
while others mention that he was born in a village named Sarābe-Kachou near Ardestan in the early 1870s, and that he moved to Shahreza when he was six.

Activities
Having studied Islamic sciences in Isfahan and Najaf, Modarres became a religious teacher in an Isfahan's madrasa. The name Modarres, which means "teacher", is because of his job there. In 1910, he was chosen by Najaf's cleric community and sent to Tehran to supervise the laws passed by the Majlis, to make sure they did not violate the rules of sharia. Later, in 1914, he was elected as a Majlis representative of Tehran.

In 1916, during World War I, he migrated to Iraq, Syria, and Turkey together with a handful of other politicians, and served as the Minister of Justice in a cabinet formed in exile by Nezam os-Saltaneh. After returning to Iran, he was elected in the Majlis elections a few more times.  Modarres fought against the presence of British forces in Persia, vigorously opposing the proposed 1919 agreement that would have transformed Iran into a British protectorate.

In the early 1920s he also played a role in preventing Reza Khan (the prime minister at the time) from abolishing the monarchy (the Qajar dynasty) and declaring a republic, and less successfully opposed Reza Khan's deposing of the Qajar dynasty in 1925. Sayyed Modaress was openly critical of Reza Shah's rule and was placed under imprisonment in retaliation for his criticisms. A few years after a November 1926 assassination attempt against him, Modarres was expelled to Khaf and later to Kashmar.

Ruhollah Khomeini, who later became the Supreme Leader of Iran after the Iranian Revolution, was affected by him.

Death
He was killed in prison in December 1937. His death is regarded as martyrdom and the martyrdom day (10th of Azar) is known in Iran as Majlis day (day of the parliament). According to Tasnim he was poisoned in prison and then suffocated while praying.

Tomb of Hassan Modarres 

The Tomb of Sayyid Hassan Modarres is the burial site of Sayyid Hassan Modares, former prime minister of Iran. It was built in 1937 in Kashmar, Iran, as opposed to using the former tomb of Kashmar in the vast gardens of Kashmar. The tomb building consists of a central dome, four dock and a dome made of turquoise, in the style of Islamic architecture and the Safavid dynasty.

Hassan Modarres Museum 

The Hassan Modarres Museum is a Museum belongs to the 21st century and is located in Kashmar, Razavi Khorasan Province in Iran.

Reception 
Modarres is depicted on the obverse of the Iranian 100 rials banknote.

See also
Tomb of Hassan Modarres
Abol-Ghasem Kashani
Mohammad Mosaddegh

References

Sources
 The Persian Encyclopedia's entry on Modarres.
 Mohammad Taghi Bahar, Taarikh-e Mokhtasar-e Ahzaab-e Siaasi-e Iraan (A Short History of Political Parties of Iran), Amirkabir, 1978.
 Yadegari, Amir Hossein (November 2005). "Siāsatmadār-e Dindār", Hamshahri-e Māh, ("Religious Politician", Our Fellow Citizen) Ābān 1384 A.P., page 4.
 Abrahamian, Ervand, Iran Between Two Revolutions, Princeton University Press, 1982
 Mottahedeh, Roy, The Mantle of the Prophet : Religion and Politics in Iran, One World, Oxford, 1985, 2000

External links

Seyyed Hassan Modaress at www.qajarpages.org
Modaress on irib.ir
Modarres on irib.ir
 Modarres Dar Ā'in-e Che'hel Sāl Mobārezeh (Modarres in the Reflection of Forty Years Struggle), Khāne-ye Mellat (Nation's Home)

Iranian Shia clerics
People of the Persian Constitutional Revolution
Iranian democracy activists
1870 births
1937 deaths
Moderate Socialists Party politicians
Reformers' Party politicians
Members of the 2nd Iranian Majlis
Members of the 3rd Iranian Majlis
Members of the 4th Iranian Majlis
Members of the 5th Iranian Majlis
Members of the 6th Iranian Majlis
Deputies of Tehran for National Consultative Assembly
People from Kashmar
Pupils of Muhammad Kadhim Khorasani